Shawn M. McCosh (born June 5, 1969) is a Canadian former professional ice hockey player. He played in 9 NHL games with the Los Angeles Kings and New York Rangers over parts of two seasons.

After retiring from hockey, McCosh moved to Phoenix, Arizona and became a middle school history teacher at Mountain Sky Junior High.

Career statistics

External links

1969 births
Living people
Adler Mannheim players
Binghamton Rangers players
Canadian ice hockey centres
Detroit Red Wings draft picks
Hamilton Dukes players
Hamilton Steelhawks players
Hershey Bears players
Sportspeople from Oshawa
Los Angeles Kings players
Kalamazoo Wings (1974–2000) players
New Haven Nighthawks players
New Haven Senators players
New York Rangers players
Niagara Falls Thunder players
Philadelphia Phantoms players
Phoenix Roadrunners (IHL) players
Ice hockey people from Ontario
Canadian expatriate ice hockey players in Germany